John Irving Fleming is an Australian priest and bioethicist. He was the founding president of Campion College. Fleming was originally an Anglican priest but later became a Roman Catholic priest. He is currently suspended from public ministry and is living in retirement in South Australia.

Early career and background
The son of an Anglican priest, Fleming graduated with a B.A. from the University of Adelaide, a Licentiate in Theology from the Australian College of Theology and a PhD in philosophy and bioethics from Griffith University. His PhD thesis was titled "Human rights and natural law : an analysis of the consensus gentium and its implications for bioethics".

Career
Fleming was a high-profile Anglo-Catholic priest in the Anglican Church of Australia's Adelaide diocese. He was ordained in 1970. He became a Roman Catholic in 1987. Although married with three children, he was given a papal dispensation permitting his ordination in the Catholic Church in 1995.

As an Anglican priest in the early 1970s he served as university chaplain and priest in charge of St Paul's Church in Adelaide and dean and vice-master of St Mark's College at the University of Adelaide. Between 1977 and 1978 he was assistant curate at St. Nicholas Church, Chiswick, in West London; and between 1978 and 1987 was the rector of the Church of the Good Shepherd, Plympton. As a Roman Catholic lay person, between 1987 and 1995, he was the founding director of Southern Cross Bioethics Institute. As a Roman Catholic priest, Fleming was director of the Southern Cross Bioethics Institute between 1995 and 2004; and from 2001, a faculty member of the John Paul II Institute for Marriage and Family. He served as the founding president of Campion College between 2004 and 2009. He was an Adjunct Professor of Bioethics at the Southern Cross Bioethics Institute, until its closure in 2012.

He has served on a number of bioethics boards including as a foundation member of UNESCO's International Bioethics Committee (1992-1996); and between 13 July 1996 and 13 July 2016, a corresponding member of the Pontifical Academy for Life. Fleming was a member of the SA Council on Reproductive Technology (1998-2004) and a Member of the Gene Technology Ethics Committee (from 2002) set up under the Australian Gene Technology Act 2000.

Fleming was a weekly columnist of The Advertiser in Adelaide and presented radio programs for a number of years. In 2005, while the president of Campion College in Sydney, Fleming hosted a short-lived talkback radio program on 2UE.

Community
Fleming was an elected delegate to the 1998 Australian Constitutional Convention associated with Australians for Constitutional Monarchy. In 2003, he was appointed by the Howard Government to the council of the National Museum of Australia with his term ending in 2009.

Personal
Fleming is married to Alison and they have three children.

Allegations of abuse
Five years after his appointment to Campion College, media reports were published alleging sexual impropriety by Fleming with three people when he was an Anglican priest some 37 years previously. Nigel Hunt, a journalist for The Advertiser and Sunday Mail, wrote that these allegations were known to the Roman Catholic Archbishop of Adelaide, the Most Reverend Leonard Faulkner, at the time of his Roman Catholic ordination.

In 2011, Fleming returned to Adelaide where he continued to work as a priest. He initiated a defamation case against the Sunday Mail regarding several stories published on the complaints and investigations. These matters had been finalised by SA Police and by the Catholic Church. The Anglican Church ceased investigations on 24 November 2020.

From 7 October 2014 and the end of September 2016, Fleming pursued a high profile, but unsuccessful, defamation action against The Advertiser and Sunday Mail in the Supreme Court of South Australia regarding reports of alleged sexual misconduct as an Anglican priest.

Fleming appealed against the dismissal of the claim for damages for defamation to the Full Court of the Supreme Court of South Australia. On 29 September 2016 this appeal was unanimously dismissed when the Full Court found no errors of law were made in the earlier judgement. Costs were awarded against him.

Fleming applied for special leave to appeal with the High Court of Australia, the application was refused because two judges stated that it did "not raise a question of general importance. None of the applicant's proposed appeal grounds enjoys sufficient prospects of success to warrant a grant of special leave. Special leave should be refused with costs."

It was decreed under canon law on 9 February 2017 by Philip Marshall, vicar general of the Catholic Archdiocese of Adelaide, that Fleming was to immediately cease all forms of ministry.

The decision was later criticised by David Flint in The Spectator and Augusto Zimmermann in Quadrant, they both state judicial failures and comment on the relevance of the Briginshaw principle to the decision.

In June 2021, Fleming lost an appeal against the denial of a clearance to work with children following a Working With Children Check heard by the South Australian Civil & Administrative Tribunal.

Bibliography

References

1943 births
Living people
Australian Anglican priests
Australian Roman Catholic priests
People from Port Lincoln
University of Adelaide alumni
Griffith University alumni
Bioethicists
Australian monarchists
Australian ethicists
Australian philosophers